9alpha-copalyl-diphosphate diphosphate-lyase may refer to:

 Stemar-13-ene synthase, an enzyme
 Stemod-13(17)-ene synthase, an enzyme
 Syn-pimara-7,15-diene synthase, an enzyme
 Aphidicolan-16beta-ol synthase, an enzyme
 Labdatriene synthase, an enzyme